Don Michael Swartzentruber (swärt-zen-trü-ber) is an American artist. His paintings, printmaking and drawing typically appropriate elements of neo-pop and surrealism. The artist, who signs with his surname, is recognized for his juxtaposition of spiritual themes with lowbrow imagery. Not one to dodge provocative topics, he engages viewers with themes that shift from a rather socratic dialogue to dogmatic sermons.

Early life
Born in 1966, he grew up in Greenwood, Delaware. He studied formally at various programs including character animation with Disney animator Milt Neil at the Kubert School. While earning  a MFA in Visual Art at Vermont College of Norwich University he studied with Karl Wirsum (Chicago Imagists), Don Baum, Joseph Seigenthaler, and Ernesto Pujol.

Exhibit highlights
Swartzentruber was raised in a Mennonite home and community. He briefly attended Rosedale Bible College and then Grace College and Seminary. His religious upbringing facilitated his creation of the controversial art exhibit Pop Mennonite. He is one of the first to appropriate Mennonite culture as a theme in contemporary art. The images manifest from cultural critique and autobiography. An audio project accompanied the exhibits at Bluffton University and Goshen College and included Mennonite music. The harshest disapproval of Pop Mennonite bred from Mennonite bloggers reviewing the paintings online.

The Totem Triptych collection offered viewers an opportunity to create reader interpretation that was billed on an equal footing as the artist’s authorial intent. The images and essay were published in various literary projects such as Footsteps to Oxford, Mung Being, and 5 Trope. The 36triptychs were exhibited at Art Space Lima and the Lincoln Center.

Facing the Sublime and the Grotesque collection was awarded an Indiana Arts Commission Grant. The artist built images based on grotesque elements in the mask collection at the Chicago Field Museum.

Commercial art
Swartzentruber also engages in commercial work such as caricatures, illustrations and exhibitions (i.e., musical group Bride “Silence is Madness”). He held positions as a television art director and graphic designer prior to entering education.

Art education
An outspoken advocate and mentor, Swartzentruber has contributed much in the training of students in the arts. He held the post of adjunct professor at Indiana Purdue Fort Wayne University, Grace College, and instructor at Warsaw Community High School. He has lectured at Notre Dame Center for Ethics and Culture, the Midwest Scholars Conference, and the Art Education Association of Indiana Conference.

Current developments
His studio is in northern Indiana, where he resides with his wife and two sons. In 2008 he received a grant to engage in material dealing with ethics and apologetics.  It included the publication of philosophers such as Alvin Plantinga, John Warwick Montgomery, Dinesh D’Souza, and William Lane Craig. The project fell under the title Carnival Sage®. He is said to be working on sequential art that will follow a similar apologetic focus.

References

1966 births
20th-century American painters
American male painters
21st-century American painters
21st-century American male artists
Visionary artists
Living people
20th-century American male artists
American Mennonites
Mennonite artists